The 1995 UNLV Rebels football team was an American football team that represented the University of Nevada, Las Vegas in the Big West Conference during the 1995 NCAA Division I-A football season. In their second year under head coach Jeff Horton, the team compiled a 2–9 record.

Schedule

References

UNLV
UNLV Rebels football seasons
UNLV Rebels football